The three cups problem, also known as the three cup challenge and other variants, is a mathematical puzzle that, in its most common form, cannot be solved.

In the beginning position of the problem, one cup is upside-down and the other two are right-side up. The objective is to turn all cups right-side up in no more than six moves, turning over exactly two cups at each move.

The solvable (but trivial) version of this puzzle begins with one cup right-side up and two cups upside-down. To solve the puzzle in a single move, turn up the two cups that are upside down — after which all three cups are facing up. As a magic trick, a magician can perform the solvable version in a convoluted way, and then ask an audience member to solve the unsolvable version.

Proof of impossibility
To see that the problem is insolvable (when starting with just one cup upside down), it suffices to concentrate on the number of cups the wrong way up. The problem is insolvable because any move changes  by an even number.

Another way of looking is that, at the start, 2 cups are in the "right" orientation and 1 is "wrong". Changing 1 right cup and 1 wrong cup, the situation remains the same. Changing 2 right cups results in a situation with 3 wrong cups, after which the next move restores the original status of 1 wrong cup. Thus, any number of moves results in a situation either with 3 wrongs or with 1 wrong, and never with 0 wrongs.

More generally, this argument shows that for any number of cups, it is impossible to reduce  to 0 if it is initially odd. On the other hand, if  is even, inverting cups two at a time will eventually result in  equaling 0.

References

See also
List of impossible puzzles
Puzzle
Recreational mathematics

Puzzles
Unsolvable puzzles